Az Zaydiyah is a city located in Al Hudaydah Governorate, Yemen and it is the district capital of Az Zaydiyah District. Its population reached 16,246 people, according to the census conducted in 2005.

References

Populated places in Al Hudaydah Governorate